Climate change in the Middle East and North Africa (MENA) refers to changes in the climate of the MENA region and the subsequent response, adaption and mitigation strategies of countries in the region. In 2018, the MENA region emitted 3.2 billion tonnes of carbon dioxide and produced 8.7% of global greenhouse gas emissions (GHG) despite making up only 6% of the global population. These emissions are mostly from the energy sector, an integral component of many Middle Eastern and North African economies due to the extensive oil and natural gas reserves that are found within the region. The region of Middle East is one of the most vulnerable to climate change. The impacts include increase in drought conditions, aridity, heatwaves and sea level rise.

Sharp global temperature and sea level changes, shifting precipitation patterns and increased frequency of extreme weather events are some of the main impacts of climate change as identified by the Intergovernmental Panel on Climate Change (IPCC). The MENA region is especially vulnerable to such impacts due to its arid and semi-arid environment, facing climatic challenges such as low rainfall, high temperatures and dry soil. The climatic conditions that foster such challenges for MENA are projected by the IPCC to worsen throughout the 21st century. If greenhouse gas emissions are not significantly reduced, part of the MENA region risks becoming uninhabitable before the year 2100.

Climate change is expected to put significant strain on already scarce water and agricultural resources within the MENA region, threatening the national security and political stability of all included countries. This has prompted some MENA countries to engage with the issue of climate change on an international level through environmental accords such as the Paris Agreement. Law and policy are also being established on a national level amongst MENA countries, with a focus on the development of renewable energies.

Greenhouse gas emissions 

As of January 2021, the UNICEF website groups the following set of 20 countries as belonging to the MENA region: 'Algeria, Bahrain, Djibouti, Egypt, Iran (Islamic Republic of), Iraq, Jordan, Kuwait, Lebanon, Libya, Morocco, Oman, Qatar, Saudi Arabia, State of Palestine, Sudan, Syrian Arab Republic, Tunisia, United Arab Emirates, Yemen.' Others include Israel as well.

Greenhouse gas emissions produced by humans have been identified by the IPCC and the vast majority of climate scientists as the primary driver of climate change. In the past three decades, the MENA region has more than tripled its greenhouse gas emissions and is currently emitting above the global average per person, with most of the top ten countries by carbon dioxide emissions per person being found in the Middle East. These high emissions levels can be primarily attributed to Saudi Arabia and Iran, which are the 9th and 7th largest emitters of CO2 in the world, accounting for 40% of the region's emissions in 2018. MENA countries heavily rely on fossil fuels for the generation of electricity, sourcing 97% of their energy from oil, natural gas, and coal (in Turkey). Fossil fuel extraction, production and exportation is also a significant component of many economies within the MENA region, which possesses 60% of the world oil reserves and 45% of known natural gas reserves. Reducing gas flaring would help.

The failure of the Iranian subsidy reform plan during the 2010s left Iran as the world's largest subsidizer of fossil fuel in 2018. But, unlike other countries which successfully removed subsidies by acting gradually, at the end of the decade, the government attempted to suddenly reduce gasoline subsidies, sparking riots.

Impacts on the natural environment

Temperature and weather changes

Heat extremes 
The IPCC project average global temperatures to rise more than 1.5 degrees by the end of the 21st century. MENA has been identified as a hotspot for future temperature changes due to its arid environmental conditions. Whilst projected rates of warming during winter months are low, the region is expected to experience extreme temperature increases during summer. Temperature rises are expected to be further amplified by reductions in rainfall and the associated depletion of soil moisture, limiting evaporative cooling. As a result, heat extremes are expected to increase significantly in both frequency and intensity across the MENA region. According to studies published by the Max Planck Institute for Chemistry, the number of very hot days in the region has doubled between the 1970s and the time when the report was published (2016). The study further projects that heatwaves will occur for 80 days of the year by 2050 and 118 days of the year by 2100. Combined with increased sandstorms associated with longer drought periods, predicted temperature rises would make large parts of the region uninhabitable.

The average maximum temperature during the hottest days of the past 30 years has been 43 degrees Celsius. Dutch atmospheric chemist Johannes Lelieveld has projected that temperature maximum's could reach almost 50 degrees Celsius under current climate scenarios established by the IPCC. Johannes Lelieveld further projects that average summer temperatures are expected to increase by up to 7% across the MENA region, and up to 10% in highly urbanised areas. Extreme heat has been identified as a serious threat to human health, heightening an individuals' susceptibility to exhaustion, heart attack and mortality. Climate scientist Ali Ahmadalipour has projected heat-related mortality rates within the MENA region to be up to 20 times higher than current rates by the end of the century.

Water resources 
The Middle East and North Africa currently faces extreme water scarcity, with twelve out of the 17 most water stressed countries in the world deriving from the region. The World Bank defines an area as being water stressed when per person water supplies fall below 1,700 cubic metres per year. The water supply across the MENA region is averaged at 1274 cubic metres per capita, with some countries having access to only 50 cubic metres per person. The agricultural sector within the MENA region is heavily dependent on irrigation systems due to its arid climate, with 85% of fresh water resources being utilised for agricultural purposes. The IPCC indicate that the global distribution of rainfall is currently shifting in response to increasing greenhouse gas emissions, with increases in high latitude and mid-latitude wet region and decreases in equatorial dry regions such as the MENA. These shifting precipitation patterns have already placed significant strain on MENA agriculture, with the frequency and severity of droughts rising significantly in the past decade.

A recent NASA study suggests that the 1998–2012 drought in the Middle East was the worst to occur in the past 900 years. Climate scientist Colin Kelley suggests that climate change was a significant contributor to the increased severity of the most recent drought in the region. He claims that such drought is 3 times more likely to occur due to human influence on climate and the drought have contributed to the beginning of the Syrian civil war. Along with environmental impacts, increasing drought periods affect agricultural incomes, diminishes public health and weakens political stability in the MENA region.  Syria experienced its most severe drought on record from 2007 to 2010, where restricted water supply degraded agricultural resources and increased economic pressures. American environmental scientist Peter Gleick also asserts that heightened social vulnerability and conflict over scare water supplies during this period catalysed the onset of the Syrian war.

However, in 2017, a study led by sociologist and political ecologist Jan Selby has discredited these claims, reporting that there is no solid evidence that climate change is associated with the drought, the same about the impact of the drought on the conflict in Syria. In 2019 Konstantin Ash
and Nick Obradovich published research indicating that extreme drought was one of the leading factors in the creation of the Syrian war.

Increasing water insecurity as a result of climate change is set to exacerbate existing food insecurities in the countries affected. A study published by the World Food Programme has predicted a decline in crop yields by 30% in 2050 as a result of increasing droughts. North African countries are highly vulnerable to reduced precipitation, as 88% of the region's crops possess no irrigation, relying on consistent rainfall. The consequences of these reduced harvests strongly impact rural regions and communities that rely heavily on agriculture as a source of income.

Sea level rise 

Alexandria is one of the most vulnerable cities to sea level rise.

Across the MENA region, 60 million people inhabited coastal areas in 2010, a population that has been predicted by the World Bank to grow to 100 million by 2030.  As a result, the population of the MENA region is expected to be significantly impacted by sea level rise occurring due to climate change. One consequence of rising sea levels is the loss of coastal wetlands, a natural resource responsible for ecosystem services such as storm buffering, water quality maintenance and carbon sequestration. A study conducted by the World Bank predicts that the MENA region would lose over 90% of its coastal and freshwater wetlands if a one-metre sea level rise were to occur.

In North Africa, Egypt is expected to be most affected by changes in sea level. A third of the Nile Delta and large parts of Alexandria, Egypt's second-largest city, lie below the mean global sea level. These areas have been drained for agricultural purposes and undergone urban development, where inundation and flooding is prevented by sea walls and dams. However, failures occurring in these structures, storm surges and extreme weather events could lead to the inundation of these areas in the future if sea levels continue to rise. Agricultural areas in Egypt are particularly at risk, where a one-metre rise in sea level would submerge 12–15% of the nation's total agricultural land. This is estimated to displace 6.7 million people in Egypt and affect millions more who rely on agriculture for income. A more moderate 50 cm increase in sea level has been projected to displace 2 million people and generate US$35 billion of damages.

Mitigation and adaptation 
The severe impacts of climate change on the region, made climate change mitigation and adaptation an important issue in it. Regional cooperation is considered as one of the main conditions for effective mitigation and adaptation.

Renewable energy 

The MENA region possesses high potential for developing renewable energy technologies due to the high levels of wind and sunshine that are associated with its climate.  The International Renewable Energy Agency (IRENA) has identified over half of all land in GCC states as being suitable for the deployment of solar and wind technologies. IRENA has also identified North African countries as having greater potential for wind and solar energy generation than all other regions of the continent. Sourcing energy from renewable technologies instead of fossil fuels could significantly reduce energy related GHG emissions, which presently account for 85% of total emissions within the MENA region. Renewable energy generation also involves significantly less water usage than processes associated with fossil fuel extraction and its conversion into usable energy, possessing the potential to improve water quality and availability within the region. Renewable energy presently accounts for 1% of the total primary energy supply across the MENA region.

At the 2016 UN Climate Change Conference in Marrakech, Morocco (COP22), Morocco, Tunisia, Yemen, Lebanon and the State of Palestine, along with 43 other countries, committed to deriving all energy from renewable resources by 2050.

Ouarzazate Solar Power Station 

The Ouarzazate Solar Power Station is a solar power complex located in the Drâa-Tafilalet region of Morocco, and is currently the largest concentrated solar power plant in the world. The complex consists of four separate power plants that utilise concentrated solar power and photovoltaic solar technology. The project, costing US$2.67 billion, is expected to provide 1.1 million Moroccans with clean energy and reduce the country's carbon emissions by 700,000 tonnes every year. The total energy capacity of the solar plant is expected to reach 2000 Megawatts by the end of 2020.

Policies and legislation

Paris Agreement 

Eleven countries from the MENA region attended the 21st Conference of the Parties of the UNFCCC where countries negotiated the Paris Agreement, an agreement with the United Nations concerning greenhouse gas emissions mitigation.  Eritrea, Iran, Iraq, Libya, and Yemen are the only countries in the world which have not ratified the agreement. Morocco has set its nationally determined contribution to a 17%-42% reduction in emissions and has set a target of having 52% of renewable energy in its total installed electricity production capacity by 2050. The share of renewable energy reached 28% in 2018 and is currently recognised by the United Nations as being on track to achieving its renewable energy targets. The UAE, despite ratifying the agreement, have set no reduction in emissions in their nationally determined contribution. The United Nations have identified their NDC target as "critically insufficient".

MENA Climate Action Plan 
In 2016 the World Bank put forth the MENA Climate Action Plan, a series of financial commitments centred around the redistribution of finance to the MENA region. The World Bank deemed the plan's core focus to be ensuring food and water security, increasing resilience to climate change impacts and improving investment in renewable energy source. One of the Action Plan's major commitments was to allocate 18-30% of MENA finance towards climate related initiatives, which currently stands a $1.5 billion annually. The World Bank have also outlined a significant increase in funding directed towards adaptation initiatives such as water conservation and recycling, introduction of desalination facilities and investment into carbon sequestration technologies.

By country

Algeria

Egypt 

Egypt's Nile Delta is impacted by saltwater intrusion caused by sea level rise, leading to major implications for the country. Agriculture and food security in Egypt will be disrupted by climate change due to increased drought, higher temperatures, extreme weather events, plant diseases and pests, with major infrastructure changes required to adapt. Water security in Egypt will also be disrupted.

Iran

Iraq

Israel 
	
		 
	
According to the Ministry of Environmental Protection of Israel: "While Israel is a relatively small contributor to climate change due to its size and population, it is sensitive to the potential impacts of the phenomenon, due to its location. Thus, it is making an effort to reduce greenhouse gas emissions while simultaneously doing whatever possible to reduce the expected damage that will result if climate change is not halted."
 
The impacts of climate change are already felt in Israel. The temperature rose by 1.4 degrees between 1950 and 2017. The number of hot days increased and the number of cold days decreased. Precipitation rates have fallen. The trends are projected to continue. By the year 2050, in the coastal area the number of days with maximal temperature above 30 degrees, per year, is projected to increase by 20 in the scenario with climate change mitigation and by 40 in "business as usual" scenario.
 	
Israel ratified the Paris Agreement in 2016. The country is part of 3 initiatives on mitigation and adaptation and 16 other actions taken by non-governmental organisations.
 
According to Israel's Intended nationally determined contribution the main mitigation target is to reduce per capita greenhouse gas emissions to 8.8 tCO2e by 2025 and to 7.7 tCO2e by 2030. Total emissions should be 81.65 MtCO2e in 2030. In the business as usual scenario the emissions would be 105.5 MtCO2e by 2030 or 10.0 tCO2e per capita. To reach it, the government of Israel wants to reduce the consumption of electricity by 17% relative to the business as usual scenario, produce 17% of electricity from renewables and shift 20% of transportation from cars to public transport by 2030.
In an effort to comply with GHG emission reductions, Israel formed a committee with the goal of evaluating the country's potential to reduce emissions by the year 2030. Their findings have confirmed that Israel's power sector generates approximately half of the country's total GHG emissions. The second-largest offender is the transport sector, which produces approximately 19% of total emissions.

Jordan

Kuwait

Morocco

Syria

Turkey

United Arab Emirates

See also
Climate change in Africa
North African climate cycles

Further reading

References

External links 
 
 Ecomena
 Environmental Organizations & Groups in MENA

Middle East
Environment of the Middle East
North Africa
 
Regional effects of climate change